Histria may refer to:
 Histria ("land of the Histri"), the ancient name of the Istrian Peninsula
 Venetia et Histria, a region (regio) of Roman Italy
 Histria (ancient city), a Greek colony on the western shore of the Black Sea
 Battle of Histria (-61 BC)